Prism Comics is a 501(c)(3) non-profit organization that promotes awareness of lesbian, gay, bisexual, and transgender (LGBT) creators, stories, characters, and readers in the comics industry. It does this through informational booths and programming at comic conventions, print and online guides to LGBT creators and comics, and the annual Queer Press Grant to assist publication of new LGBT-themed work.

Prism Comics incorporated in April 2003 in the state of Georgia, and received its 501(c)(3) charitable status shortly thereafter. The organization was initially composed of a small number of comics fans and professionals from across the United States who had volunteered on an annual publication called Out in Comics, which was a listing of LGBT creators in comics that ran for three issues. Following incorporation, it expanded activities, publishing feature articles, interviews, original, art and content; expanding convention appearances and programming; and (until late 2014) a web forum.

Points of interest
 Maintains a comprehensive website, PrismComics.org, that posts LGBT-related comics news, reviews, and profiles of nearly 300 LGBT comics professionals.
 Produces weekly articles featured on the Prism website.
 Works with comics convention organizers to include LGBT content in their programming schedules, helping them to procure panelists, and promoting the panels in fan venues and in the LGBT and comics media.
 Purchases booth space at major comics conventions each year as an outreach effort to the industry to promote the work of LGBT creators in comics who are not having their work promoted sufficiently elsewhere.

Queer Press Grant
Prism awards one-time financial grants to comics creators who are self-publishing a work of interest to an LGBT audience. In 2005 and 2006, the value of the grant was $1000, in 2007 it was raised to $1500, and later to $2000. The grant is announced annually at Wondercon comic convention in Anaheim, California. In 2020, the Prism Awards was held virtually as a two-day livestream.

Recipients are:
 2005: Steve MacIsaac for Shirtlifter
 2006: Megan Rose Gedris for YU+ME:dream
 2007: Justin Hall for A Sacred Text, True Travel Tales, Hard to Swallow
 2007: Tommy Roddy for Pride High
 2008: Pam Harrison for House of Muses
 2009: Ed Luce for Wuvable Oaf
 2009: Eric Orner for Storybox
 2010: Jon Macy for Fearful Hunter
 2010: Tana Ford for Duck
 2011: Robert Kirby for THREE
 2012: Christine Smith for The Princess
 2012: Blue Delliquanti for O Human Star
 2013: Hazel Newlevant for If This Be Sin
 2014: Calvin Gimpelevich for Wolfmen
 2015: Dave Davenport for Stray Bullet
 2016: Elizabeth Beier for Bisexual Trials and Errors
 2016: Catherine Esguerra for Eighty Days
 2017: Tee Franklin
 2018: Eric Kostiuk Williams

References

External links
 

Companies established in 2003
LGBT-related mass media in the United States
501(c)(3) organizations